Four ships of the Royal Navy have borne the name HMS Carnation.

  was a  launched in 1807, but captured by the French in 1808, and burnt by the British in 1809.
  was another Cruizer-class brig-sloop, launched in 1813, and sunk as a target in 1867.
  was a  sloop, launched in 1915, and sold for breaking up in 1922.

References
 
  

Royal Navy ship names